Klára Kolouchová, born Klára Poláčková (* 6 September 1978) is a Czech mountaineer who became the second Czech woman to summit Mount Everest, after Renata Chlumska.

Biography 

Klára Poláčková worked as a PR manager for foreign companies in parallel to studies of business management at the Anglo-American University in Prague. Following her post as Regional Communications Manager at Euro RSCG Worldwide (2000–2003), she took up a position in the London office (2003–2004) and (in 2004–2006) worked as a communications consultant in the UK for the Department for Constitutional Affairs and the Department of Health.

In 2008 she had a daughter Emma (* 20 March 2008). After returning to the Czech Republic, she joined the consulting firm McKinsey & Company. In 2013 she married Martin Kolouch. She had a second child, son Cyril (* 16 May 2014).

Apart from mountaineering, her favourite sport is tennis and she won the LTA tournament at the Queens Club in London.

Expeditions

Cho Oyu 
On 9 March 2006 Klára Poláčková reached the summit of Cho Oyu, climbing with her guide and friend Tashi Tenzing.

Mount Everest 

Klára Poláčková summited Mount Everest on 15 May 2007, at 8.16 Nepal Standard Time, climbing with Tashi Tenzing. They ascended the normal route from the northern side.

Klára Poláčková summited K2 largely with the help of Nirmal Purja and his team, who was able to clear and secure a path for everyone. Poláčková rejected Purja's offer to climb the summit with him and his team and only did so after they had made it back. Poláčková later stated in the documentary 14 Peaks: Nothing Is Impossible that 24 climbers were able to make it to the summit.

Other climbs 
 2005 Aconcagua (6962 m) 
 2019 Kanchenjunga (8586 m)
 2019 K2 (8611 m)

External links 
Homepage of Klára Poláčková

Klára Poláčková on TV:
Programme Uvolněte se, prosím on 22 June 2007
Programme Krásný ztráty on 26 June 2008
Programme Banánové rybičky on 27 June 2007

1978 births
Living people
Summiters of Mount Everest
Czech mountain climbers